Uyire Uyire is a 2016 Tamil-language romantic drama film directed by A. Rajasekhar and produced by veteran actress Jaya Prada and former politician Amar Singh. The film, a remake of Vikram Kumar's 2012 Telugu film Ishq, stars Jaya Prada's nephew Siddhu and Hansika Motwani. The film was released on 1 April 2016 to mixed reviews from critics.

Cast
 Siddhu as Rahul
 Hansika Motwani as Priya
 Ajay as Shiva
 Chaya Singh as Divya
 Aadukalam Naren as Priya's father
 Uma as Priya's mother
 Jagan as Rahul's friend
 Meera Krishnan as Rahul's mother

Production
Following the success of Vikram Kumar's 2012 Telugu film Ishq, veteran actress Jaya Prada acquired the Tamil remake rights of the film and announced in June 2012 that she would make the film with her nephew Siddhu in the lead role, while A. Rajasekhar, who had previously made Sathyam, would direct the venture. She had initially attempted to launch Siddhu through a bilingual venture titled Classmates in 2001, where he would feature alongside actresses Reemma Sen, Yukta Mookhey and Dia Mirza, but the film did not materialise. He later made his acting debut in the Telugu film, Tapana (2004), co-starring Prabhu Deva. While Nithya Menen, who had starred in the original, was initially considered for the lead role - it was later handed to Hansika Motwani.

The filming was under way by late 2013 with Hansika filming a song in Goa in December during a three-day schedule. A first look poster was unveiled on 14 January 2014 coinciding with the Tamil festival of Thai Pongal.

Soundtrack
The music was composed by Anup Rubens , Aravind–Shankar and released by Divo. All Lyrics were written By Viveka

References

External links
 

2016 films
Tamil remakes of Telugu films
2010s Tamil-language films
Indian romantic comedy films